Pamvouprasiakos Sports Group Varda, aka PAO Varda, is a football club founded in 1948 in Varda.
The team colors are green and white and the headquarters of the club is the stage "Gregory Kalakos" .

History
The Initial Name of the team was Asteras Varda and the colors were crimson, black and white. The name was changed to Pambouprasiakos Sports Group Vardas PAO Varda on 11 January 1958.

PAO Vardas for the first time in its history became Champion of Elis in 1991–92 and won promotion to Delta Ethniki. 
PAO Vardas played in Delta Ethniki for the 2003–04 and 2004–05 seasons, and won promotion to Gamma Ethniki, but the following year was relegated and played the 2007–08 season in Delta Ethniki. During 2008–09, after fruitless efforts to find a solution to the administrative problem of the group, it was announced that it will not participate in the league.

Since 2013, the team participating in Gamma Ethniki.

External links
paovardas.blogspot.se 

Association football clubs established in 1948
Football clubs in Western Greece
Elis
Vouprasia
1948 establishments in Greece
Gamma Ethniki clubs